The surname Rosado may refer to :
 Ángel Aníbal Rosado (1942–2008), a Peruvian composer
 Arnaldo Darío Rosado (1953–1978), an activist for the independence of Puerto Rico
 Carlos Rosado (born 1975), a retired Mexican American football player
 Carmen García Rosado (born 1926), an educator, author and activist for the rights of women veterans
 David Rosado (born 1942), New York politician
 Diogo Rosado (born 1990), a Portuguese football player
 Gabriel Rosado (born 1986), a Puerto Rican-American boxer
 José Rosado (born 1974), a former Major League Baseball player
 Juan Manuel Rosado (born 1974), a retired Spanish football player
 Julio Rosado del Valle (1922–2008), an internationally known abstract expressionist
 Luis Rosado (born 1955), a retired Puerto-Rican Major League Baseball player

See also 
 Rosado (disambiguation)